Aaron Hargreaves (born January 26, 1986, in Ladner, British Columbia) is a Canadian football wide receiver who is currently a free agent. He was drafted by the Winnipeg Blue Bombers in the second round with the 15th pick in the 2008 CFL Draft. He played CIS Football for the Simon Fraser Clan. He has also played for the Edmonton Eskimos and Saskatchewan Roughriders.

External links
Ottawa bio

1986 births
Living people
Canadian football wide receivers
Edmonton Elks players
Ottawa Redblacks players
People from Delta, British Columbia
Players of Canadian football from British Columbia
Saskatchewan Roughriders players
Simon Fraser Clan football players
Winnipeg Blue Bombers players